, was an admiral in the Imperial Japanese Navy during World War II.

Biography
Although born into the Kondō family of Shizuoka city Shizuoka Prefecture, Kimura was adopted by a family in Tottori city, Tottori prefecture soon after birth, and considered Tottori his official residence. He was a graduate of the 41st class of the Imperial Japanese Naval Academy, but was a mediocre student, placing 107 out of 118 cadets.

After his promotion to lieutenant in 1920, he commanded numerous torpedo boats and minesweepers. In 1926, after he was promoted to lieutenant commander, he was given command of the destroyer . He was promoted to commander in 1932 and to captain in 1937.

Kimura was captain of Suzuya during the attack on Pearl Harbor. He later assisted in the rescue of the crew of the  after that cruiser had been hit and sunk by American bombers during the Battle of Midway. On 1 November 1942, Kimura was promoted to Rear Admiral. He was assigned to escort eight transports with 6000 soldiers of the IJA 51st Division and 400 marines from Rabaul to Lae, New Guinea. In the Battle of the Bismarck Sea on 3–4 March 1943, US Navy and RAAF bombers inflicted severe damage on the Japanese convoy, sinking all of the transports and four destroyers. Admiral Kimura was wounded by machine gun fire in the shoulder and stomach, and his flagship, Shirayuki, was among the four destroyers sunk during the engagement. He, and most of his crew, were rescued by Shikinami.

After recovering from his injuries, Kimura, with an augmented DesRon 1, was assigned to cover the withdrawal of Japanese troops from Kiska Island in the Aleutians. When poor weather threatened the withdrawal operations, Kimura disobeyed orders and remained on station until the last man was recovered. Still in command of DesRon 1, Kimura sortied from Pescadores, Formosa on 22 October 1944 to join Vice Admiral Kiyohide Shima's Second Striking Force in the battle of Surigao strait, transferring his flag from  when she was disabled by a torpedo fired by Lieutenant (jg) Mike Kovar's PT-137. Afterward, in 1944, he was assigned to escort reinforcements to Leyte Island and Mindoro Island in the Philippines. On 1 April 1945, Kimura became commandant of the Anti-submarine Warfare School, and the Hofu Naval Communications School. He was promoted to Vice Admiral on 1 November 1945, a few days before he entered the reserves on 10 November.

Kimura had a postwar career in the salt industry, and died of stomach cancer in 1960, aged 68.

References

Books

*

External links
Brad Manera,(Military Historian, Australian War Memorial, 2003, Battle of the Bismarck Sea, 2-4 March 1943  
Historic Wings: Battle of the Bismarck Sea
Dr Alan Stephens, ?, "Battle of the Bismarck Sea" 
Geoff Hastwell, 2003, "The Battle of the Bismarck Sea" 
Allyn D. Nevitt, 1996, "Battle of the Bismarck Sea"

Notes 

1891 births
1960 deaths
People from Shizuoka (city)
Military personnel from Tottori Prefecture
Japanese admirals of World War II
Imperial Japanese Navy admirals
attack on Pearl Harbor
Battle of Midway
Deaths from stomach cancer
Deaths from cancer in Japan